Platanus wrightii, the Arizona sycamore, is a sycamore tree native to Arizona and New Mexico with its range extending south into the Mexican states of Sonora, Chihuahua, and Sinaloa.

Distribution
The Arizona sycamore is a tree of central Arizona's transition zone in the Mogollon Rim–White Mountains. The range extends into southwest New Mexico and parts of Sonora, Chihuahua, and Sinaloa in Mexico. In Arizona the range extends south towards northern Sonora. The range in southeast Arizona is a northeasterly part of the Sonoran Desert, and is at the northern region of the Sierra Madre Occidental cordillera.

Arizona sycamore is prevalent in riparian areas of the Madrean Sky Islands, mountain sky islands in southeast Arizona, extreme southwest, Bootheel region of New Mexico and along the San Francisco River in Western New Mexico, northeastern Sonora, and extreme northwest Chihuahua). The species is more prevalent west of the Madrean Sky Islands region, still in the central and northeast Sonoran Desert, an area around the Organ Pipe Cactus National Monument at the Arizona-Sonora border, with the species range extending in Sonora in the Occidentals, or its western foothills. Scattered reports have been made farther east in the Sierra Madre Occidental.

Notes

External links
 
 Jepson Manual Treatment
 

W
Flora of Arizona
Flora of New Mexico
Flora of the Sonoran Deserts
Trees of Northwestern Mexico
Trees of the Southwestern United States
Trees of the South-Central United States
Flora without expected TNC conservation status